Devaki (Sanskrit: देवकी, IAST: Devakī) is a character in Hindu literature, most noted for being the mother of the god Krishna. She is one of the seven daughters of Devapa or Devaka, a king of the Yadu dynasty, and has four brothers. She is one of the wives of Vasudeva. Her cousin is Kamsa, the king of Mathura, a cruel tyrant who had been told by Narada that he had been an asura killed by Vishnu in his previous life (Kalanemi), exacerbating his wickedness. According to popular tradition, Devaki is considered to be an incarnation of Aditi, a mother goddess who was the daughter of Daksha and the wife of Kashyapa.

Marriage 

During the nuptials of Vasudeva and Devaki following the former's wedding with his bride's six older sisters, Vishnu picked a lock of hair from his mount Shesha as well as his own, proclaiming that they would take be born as Devaki's seventh and eighth children, respectively. After the marriage ceremony, Kamsa volunteered to escort the newly-weds to Mathura and drove their chariot. A celestial voice, an aśarīrī, prophesied that the eighth child of Devaki would become Kamsa's death, and deliver the land from his wickedness. Angered, Kamsa rose to kill Devaki, but was stopped by Vasudeva, who promised to give each child to Kamsa, whom he would subsequently kill.

Imprisonment

Devaki and Vasudeva were imprisoned by Kamsa due to the paranoia that had taken root in the tyrant's mind. Her six children were killed, while the seventh Balarama survived after being transferred by divine will into the uterus of Rohini, one of the other wives of Vasudeva. 

Devaki's six dead sons were named Kírttimat, Sushena, Udayin, Bhadrasena, Rijudasa, and Bhadradeha. According to the Harivamsa, these were the reincarnations of the sons of the asura Kalanemi. They had performed intense austerities to worship the creator deity Brahma, unbeknownst to their own grandfather, Hiranyakashipu. The latter, furious at their actions, cursed them to be born on earth and be slain by Kamsa, who himself was a form of their father.

Devaki soon mothered Balarama through the surrogacy of Rohini. 

When Devaki delivered Krishna, he revealed his divine form to his parents, and ordered Vasudeva to take him to Gokulam, placing all the prison guards under a spell of slumber, so that Kamsa would not realise that his prophesied killer had been born. Vasudeva swapped Krishna with Yogamaya, the daughter who had been born to Nanda and Yashoda on the very same day, and returned to the cell. 

When Kamsa stormed into the chamber after the spell had worn out, he deduced that Devaki had given birth to a girl. Devaki protested against the killing of the daughter of Nanda and Yashoda, but Kamsa hurled her against a rock, recognising that the gender of his prophesied slayer had not been specified. Yashoda's daughter transformed into an eight-armed goddess, and stated, "Fool, your destroyer has already been born elsewhere." She subsequently vanished into the heavens.

Devaki and Vasudeva's imprisonment came to an end after Kamsa's death.

Salvation to the Sadgarbhas
Devaki, upon hearing how Krishna restored his Guru Sandipani's son, wished to see her own children. Krishna acceded her request and brought the children to Devaki from Patala. She nursed them with her milk and they attained heaven.

Death
After the passing of Vasudeva after the Yadu massacre, Devaki cremated herself on Vasudeva's pyre, performing sati, along with his other wives, Rohini, Bhadra, and Madira.

Worship 

In the state of Goa, Devaki Krishna Sansthan temple is a unique temple, perhaps is the only temple in India where Krishna is worshiped alongside mother Devaki. The main deity Devakikrishna and affiliate deities of Bhumika Devi, Laxmi Ravalnath, Mallinath, Katyayani, Chodaneshwar and Dhada Shankar were originally located at Choodamani island (Chorão island of today). To avoid persecution during the Goa Inquisition they were taken to Mayem in Bicholim and from there shifted to the present location at Mashel. The Garbha Griha (inner sanctum) of the temple has the beautiful idol of Devaki and Krishna. The idol of Devaki is in standing posture holding baby Krishna with her left hand.

See also

Iringole Kavu
Yogmaya Temple
Gomanta Kingdom

Notes

References

People related to Krishna
Characters in the Mahabharata
Characters in the Bhagavata Purana